Frappé or frappe may refer to:

Food and drink
Frappé coffee, an iced coffee beverage made from instant coffee originally from Greece
Frappe, a milkshake with ice cream in New England
A drink similar to the trademarked Frappuccino
Frappe, an Italian and Corsican name for angel wings, a sweet, crisp pastry made with deep-fried dough

Other uses
Le temps frappé, a French term for musical downbeat
Force de frappe, the French Nuclear Force
Frappé, in Glossary of ballet